George Van Eman Lawrence (November 13, 1818  – October 2, 1904) was a Republican member of the U.S. House of Representatives from Pennsylvania.

Biography
George Van Eman Lawrence (son of Joseph Lawrence) was born in Washington County, Pennsylvania. He attended the common schools and Washington College (now Washington & Jefferson College) in Washington, Pennsylvania. He was engaged in agricultural pursuits.

Lawrence was a member of the Pennsylvania State House of Representatives in 1844, 1847, 1858, and 1859. He served in the Pennsylvania State Senate from 1849 to 1851 and 1861 to 1863. He presided over the senate in 1863.

Lawrence was elected as a Republican to the Thirty-ninth and Fortieth Congresses. He was not a candidate for renomination in 1868. He was a delegate to the State constitutional convention in 1872. He was a member of the State Senate under the new constitution in 1875, 1876, and 1878. He was again elected as a Republican to the Forty-eighth Congress. He was not a candidate for renomination in 1884. He was again served in the Pennsylvania State House of Representatives from 1893 to 1896.

He died in Monongahela, Pennsylvania in 1904, aged 85, and was interred in the City Cemetery.

Sources

The Political Graveyard

1818 births
1904 deaths
Republican Party members of the Pennsylvania House of Representatives
Washington & Jefferson College alumni
Republican Party Pennsylvania state senators
People from Washington County, Pennsylvania
Republican Party members of the United States House of Representatives from Pennsylvania
19th-century American politicians